The National Dog Show is an all-breed benched conformation show sanctioned by the American Kennel Club and the Kennel Club of Philadelphia, which takes place on Thanksgiving each year and has been televised on NBC since 2002.

History

The Kennel Club of Philadelphia Dog Show began in 1879, following a format established by a one-time dog show held at the United States centennial in 1876. The show ran annually through 1927; it resumed in 1933 and has been held every year since.  The show is held by The Kennel Club of Philadelphia, a founding club of AKC. It traditionally takes place on the third from last weekend in November over two days.  In 2002, NBC Sports began televising the show on Thanksgiving Day and rebranded it as The National Dog Show.

The National Dog Show is one of the three major dog shows in the United States, along with the AKC National Championship and the Westminster Dog Show. Winners may be invited to compete at Crufts. As with all AKC conformation shows, mixed-breed dogs are not eligible to participate.

The NDS is one of the last six remaining benched dog shows in the United States.

The COVID-19 pandemic in 2020 caused the show to be held behind closed doors for the first time.

The first dog to win two consecutive Best In Show awards in the show's history was GCH Foxcliffe Claire Randall Fraser, a Scottish deerhound who won Best in Show in 2020 and 2021.

Television history
The show is nationally televised (on tape delay) in the United States on NBC every Thanksgiving; the show airs after the network's coverage of the Macy's Thanksgiving Day Parade and airs at noon in all time zones except for Puerto Rico and the U.S. Virgin Islands which airs at 1 PM AST (due to NBC affiliates in these territories using the Eastern Time Zone feed). Actor John O'Hurley and American Kennel Club judge David Frei host, and the show's presenting sponsor is Nestlé Purina PetCare.

The introduction of the television showings was drawn out of inspiration from the 2000 film Best in Show. NBC had attempted to fill the slot vacated by NBC's loss of Thanksgiving football rights four years prior; it had been airing It's a Wonderful Life in the time slot but found that the film was not doing well enough in the ratings to justify continuing to air it there. NBC Sports's Jon Miller noted that the family atmosphere of Thanksgiving made the dog show a perfect fit for the slot after the parade, since pets are often considered an extension of the family unit, and surmised that viewers often had a rooting interest for the breeds of dogs they owned (which Miller dubbed an "alma mater effect").

Chairmen
 Charles Schaefer (2001–2004)
 William H. Burland (2005–2013)
 Frank DePaulo (2014–present)

Previous Best in Show winners

References

External links

NBCSports page

Dog shows and showing
Thanksgiving (United States)
American annual television specials